Rägavere Parish was a rural municipality of Estonia, in Lääne-Viru County. It had a population of 993 (2006) and an area of 173.74 km².

Villages
Aarla, Aasuvälja, Kantküla, Kõrma, Lavi, Männikvälja, Miila, Mõedaka, Nõmmise, Nurkse, Põlula, Sae, Uljaste, Ulvi, Viru-Kabala

References

This article includes content from the Estonian Wikipedia article Rägavere vald.

External links